Beirne may refer to:

Places:
Beirne, Arkansas, unincorporated community in southern Clark County, Arkansas, United States

Surname:
Alannah Beirne (born 1993), Irish fashion model and reality TV personality
Andrew Beirne (1771–1845), Congressman from Virginia
Brian Beirne (born 1946), radio DJ for KRTH-FM aka K-EARTH 101 in Southern California
Bryan Patrick Beirne (1918–1998), Irish entomologist who emigrated to Canada
Charles Beirne, S.J. (1938–2010), American Jesuit and academic administrator
Gerard Beirne, Irish author
Jim Beirne (1946–2021), American football wide receiver
John Beirne (1893–1967), Irish Clann na Talmhan politician
Katie Beirne Fallon, the White House Director of Legislative Affairs
Keith Beirne (born 1996/1997), Leitrim Gaelic footballer
Kevin Beirne (born 1974), Major League Baseball right-handed pitcher
Logan Beirne, American entrepreneur, writer, and academic
Oliver Beirne (1811–1888), landowner from West Virginia
Pat Beirne of Drumaville Consortium, group of eight businessmen
Paul Beirne (born 1966), Canadian sports executive, president of the Canadian Premier League
Tadhg Beirne (born 1992), Irish rugby union player
Thomas Beirne (businessman) KSG (1860–1949), businessman, politician and philanthropist in Australia
Thomas Beirne (writer) (fl. c. 1900) was an Irish language writer and activist
Walter Beirne (1907–1959), Irish trade union leader

See also
Byrnside-Beirne-Johnson House, (Willowbrook), a historic home near Union, Monroe County, West Virginia
TC Beirne School of Law at the University of Queensland, Australia
TC Beirne Department Store, Queensland, Australia
O'Beirne